Jakub Solnický (born 16 December 1994 in Opava) is a Czech professional squash player. As of May 2021, he was ranked number 107 in the world.

References

1994 births
Living people
Czech male squash players
Sportspeople from Opava
Competitors at the 2022 World Games